Yola South is a Local Government Area of Adamawa State, Nigeria.

See also
Yola

References

Local Government Areas in Adamawa State